Udaya Kumar P S is a Kannada film director and editor based in India, who started his career as an editor, working with Nagathihalli Chandrashekar and directed a movie Kaarmoda Saridu in the year 2019

Early life 
Udaya Was born in Kudremukha of Chikmagalur district. Udaya Kumar PS was born on 3 May 1986 to Subramaniyam & Devika in Kudremukh a town in Karnataka. He completed college from St. Xavier Mangalore. Completed Film Editing from TV & Film Institute.Is a full-time Film Director & Editor.

Career

As director 
Udaya Kumar has directed his debut in the year 2019. His first directorial Karmoda Saridu received a mixed response from the audience and critics. He has also made several short films and also won many awards with regard to the same.

As editor 
Udaya Kumar started his career as an editor. He worked under the state award winner Srikanth of Ugram & KGF fame. during his work with Srikanth he has worked in famous Kannada movies like, Ishtakamya, India vs England, Khakii, Enendu hesaridali, Kaarmoda Saridu, Kirita, Vaasu pakka commercial. He has his own studio under the name of GStudio.

Filmography

References

Kannada film directors
Living people
Kannada-language lyricists
Indian male songwriters
Musicians from Bangalore
Film directors from Bangalore
21st-century Indian composers
Film producers from Bangalore
Screenwriters from Bangalore
Kannada screenwriters
21st-century male musicians
1986 births